Christian Fredrik Michelet may refer to:

 Christian Fredrik Michelet (politician) (1863–1927), Norwegian lawyer and politician for the Conservative Party
 Christian Fredrik Michelet (major) (1860–1935), Norwegian military officer and equestrian
 Christian Fredrik Michelet (businessman) (1891–1962), Norwegian military officer and businessperson
 Christian Frederik Michelet (1792–1874), Norwegian military officer